Marek Potemski is a Polish physicist currently at LNCMI and an Elected Fellow of the American Physical Society.

References

Year of birth missing (living people)
Living people
Fellows of the American Physical Society
French physicists
Place of birth missing (living people)